This article lists the results and fixtures for the Madagascar women's national football team.

The national team's first activity was in 2015, when they participated in the African games women's qualification against Botswana. They finished second in the 2015 Indian Ocean Games, losing only one game out of four, they participated in the COSAFA Women's Championship annually since 2017 until 2019 where the team got inactive, Madagascar is ranked 181 in the FIFA Women's World Rankings.

Record per opponent
Key

The following table shows Madagascar' all-time official international record per opponent:

Last updated: Madagascar vs South Africa, 5 August 2019.

Results

2015

2016

2017

2018

2019

See also
 Madagascar national football team results

References

External links
 Madagascar results on The Roon Ba
 Madagascar results on Global Sports Archive
 Madagascar results on worldfootball.net

2010s in Madagascar
Madagascar
results women's